Yazgulyam, alternatively spelt Yazgulyami, Yazgulami, Yazgulomi, and Iazgulemi, may refer to:

 Yazgulyam River in Tajikistan
 Yazgulem Range, a mountain range in the Pamir, Tajikistan
 Yazgulyam language, an Iranian language of Tajikistan
 Yazgulyam people of Tajikistan

Language and nationality disambiguation pages